The Tilburg Trappers are a professional ice hockey club based in Tilburg, The Netherlands. They previously played in the highest level ice hockey league in the country, but have been playing in the German Oberliga Nord since the  2015-16 season. Founded on 21 October 1938, they were officially recognised by the National Federation on 18 January 1939. The Trappers were crowned Eredivisie champions for the first time in the 1946-47 season, adding another 14 National Dutch Championships, 15 Dutch National Cups and 3 German Oberliga Championships over the years. 

The club has an amateur branch, which is a separate legal entity and plays in the highest Dutch league (Eredivsie). The Trappers play their home games in the Stappegoor IJssportcentrum Tilburg.

Season results

Note: GP = Games played, W = Wins, OTW = Overtime Wins, OTL = Overtime Losses, L = Losses, GF = Goals for, GA = Goals against, Pts = Points

Players

2019/20

Staff

2019/20

Coaching/Team Staff
 Bohuslav Subr, Head Coach 
 Josh Mizerek, Assistant Coach 

Medical Staff

 Marcel van Putten, medical doctor 
 Henri Zomer, medical doctor 
 Freek van Bladel, Physiotherapeut 
 Wim Spijkers, Physiotherapeut 
 Berrie Aarts, Kit Manager 
 Barry Robeerst, Kit Manager 
 Jan de Jong, Kit Manager 

Sport Management

 Peter-Paul van Rooij, First Teammanager 
 Johan van de Ven, Second Teammanager

Transfers

2019/20
In:
 Diego Hofland - Füchse Duisburg (Oberliga)
 Bartek Bison - Bismarck Bobcats (NAHL)
 Raymond van der Schuit - Nijmegen Devils (BeNe-League)

Out:
 Ivy van den Heuvel - stopped
 Nick de Ruijter - stopped
 Nardo Nagtzaam - EC Peiting (Oberliga)
 Giovanni Vogelaar - EHC Bregenzerwald (Alpenliga)
 Brock Montgomery - unknown

Former coaches
 Larry Suarez 16.02.1964 USA
 Doug Mason
 Marc Boileau
 Fred Shero
 Paul Gardner
 Lou Vairo

Championships and Cup Wins
German Oberliga Championship (2016, 2017, 2018)
Dutch national Championship (1948, 1971, 1972, 1973, 1974, 1975, 1976, 1994, 1995, 1996, 2001, 2007, 2008, 2013, 2014, 2015)
Cup Nationale Nederlanden (1971, 1972, 1973, 1974, 1975, 1976, 1996, 1998, 1999, 2002, 2003, 2004, 2008, 2010, 2011, 2013, 2014, 2015)
Dutch Super Cup, Ron Bertelingschaal (2008, 2009, 2012, 2014, 2015)

Retired numbers

Prize winning players
 Jack de Heer Trofee: Topscorer (since season 1999-2000)
Daryl Bat (2009-2010), Taggert Desmet (2008-2009), Mike Lalonde (2007-2008), Dave Bonk (2006-2007), Jeffrey Maed (1999-2000)

 Wil van Dommelen Trofee: Best defender (since season 1999-2000)
Jordy van Oorschot (2014-2015), Wil Colbert (2013-2014), Stanislav Nazarov (2003-2004), Leo van den Thillart (2002-2003), Don Nichols (2000-2001)

  Frans Henrichs Bokaal: Most Valuable Dutch Player (since 1987)
Diederick Hagemeijer (2011-2012), Peter van Biezen (2010-2011), Doug Stienstra (2007-2008), Doug Stienstra (2006-2007), Rody Jacobs (2000-2001), Theo van Gerwen (1995-1996), Antoine Geesink (1994-1995), Dave Livingston (1993-1994)

  Göbel - de Bruyn Trofee: Best goalie (since season 1999-2000)
Ian Meierdres (2012-2013), Ian Meierdres (2010-2011), Paulo Colaiacovo (2007-2008), Martin Trommelen (2003-2004)

  Bennie Tijnagel-Trofee: Dutch talent in the Eredivisie (since 2005)
Jordy Verkiel (2014-2015), Ivy van den Heuvel (2010-2011)

Famous players
Klaas van den Broek
Huub van Dun
Leo Van den Thillart
Paulo Colaiacovo
Jerry Göbel
Frank Jacobs
John MacDonald
Jiri Petrnousek
Joe Simons
Sean Simpson
Billy Thompson
Martin Trommelen
Dale Weise

References

External links
 Official website
 TYSC Tilburg Trappers History Site

Ice hockey teams in the Netherlands
Ice hockey clubs established in 1938
1938 establishments in the Netherlands
Sports clubs in Tilburg